Ben Marshall (born 29 March 1991) is an English footballer, and former professional, who plays for West Lancashire Division One side Stoneclough. He normally plays as a winger or right back.

Born in Salford, Marshall began his career as a youth player with Manchester United. He joined Crewe Alexandra in 2003. He went professional in 2009, with Stoke City, but struggled to break into the first team and went on loan to four clubs. In 2012, he made permanent transfer on deadline day to Leicester City. After only one season with Leicester, he moved to Blackburn Rovers in 2013. After  seasons with Blackburn, he signed for Wolverhampton Wanderers on 31 January 2017.

Club career

Early career
Ben Marshall started his career in Manchester United's academy as a seven-year-old in 1997. He remained there until 2005, when he joined Dario Gradi at Crewe Alexandra's academy. He spent a total of 4 years at Crewe Alexandra.

Stoke City
Marshall signed for Stoke City on 8 July 2009 along with fellow youngster Matthew Lund from Crewe, both having come through the youth system at the Alexandra Stadium.

Northampton Town (loan)
After an impressive pre-season for Stoke, he joined Northampton Town on loan for three months on 7 August to gain some first team experience and he earned praise from Cobblers boss Stuart Gray. Marshall returned to Stoke on 4 November 2009.

Cheltenham Town (loan)
On 13 November 2009, Marshall was sent on a month's loan with Cheltenham Town. He made his debut on 14 November 2009 in a 1–1 draw with Lincoln City.

Carlisle United (loan)
On 1 February 2010, Marshall moved on loan to League One side Carlisle United. He made his debut for the Cumbrians in a 2–1 defeat to Colchester United. He played 20 games and scored three goals for Carlisle.

He returned to Carlisle on a six-month loan on 31 August 2010. Marshall stated that he was 'excited' about rejoining Carlisle United on loan. His loan was then extended until the end of the season. His performances earned the praise of Carlisle manager Greg Abbott. He won the Football League Trophy with United, playing 23 minutes of the final against Brentford before being injured by Adam Reed. The tackle by Reed resulted in a broken leg for Marshall.

Sheffield Wednesday (loan)
Following his return from injury, Marshall joined Sheffield Wednesday on a five-month loan. Wednesday manager Gary Megson stated that he wanted to try and sign Marshall on a permanent basis. Marshall, however, failed to sign the contract before the end of his loan spell and so returned to Stoke. Marshall was offered a new three-year contract with Stoke in December 2011. He rejected this contract offer and joined Leicester City.

Leicester City

Marshall joined Leicester on 31 January 2012 for a fee of £750,000, possibly rising to £1 million based on promotion and appearance clauses. He scored his first competitive goal for the club in a 5–2 FA Cup quarter-final defeat to Chelsea on 18 March 2012 and scored his first league goal six days later against Hull City. Marshall's fine form continued with goals in both of Leicester's victories over the Easter weekend against Doncaster Rovers and Ipswich Town.

Marshall scored his first goal of the 2012–13 season in a 1–0 home win over Blackpool.

Blackburn Rovers
It was announced on 28 August 2013 that Marshall had signed for Blackburn Rovers on a four-year deal. He scored his first goal for the club on 14 December 2013 in a 3–2 home victory against Millwall. Marshall had just started to establish himself as starter for the club, putting in a number of impressive displays, when he suffered an ankle ligament injury in a game against Derby on 25 January 2013. Scans revealed that Marshall would be ruled out for several months and was therefore likely to miss the remainder of the season.

On 26 September 2016, after bids from Fulham and Wolves had been turned down over the summer, Marshall was offered a new contract by Blackburn, with his deal at the time set to expire at the end of the season. Marshall, however, turned the contract down and was made unavailable for the first team by then Blackburn manager Owen Coyle on 19 January 2017, following another bid by Wolves. His last appearance for the club came in a 3–2 defeat at Ipswich Town on 14 January 2017.

Wolverhampton Wanderers
On 31 January 2017 Marshall signed for fellow Championship side Wolverhampton Wanderers on a three-and-a-half year deal for an undisclosed fee, reported to be around £1.2m. Marshall was reunited with his former manager Paul Lambert, who had managed him at Blackburn during the 2015–16 season.

Marshall's Wolves debut came on 4 February 2017 in a 2–1 loss against Burton Albion at the Pirelli Stadium, coming off the bench for Andreas Weimann in the 80th minute. Marshall was revealed to have been assigned the shirt number 64. Marshall made his first start and home debut for the club in a 1–0 home defeat by Wigan Athletic. His first Wolves goal came on 4 March 2017 at Reading in a 2–1 loss. On 17 April 2017, Marshall provided the assist for Nouha Dicko in a 1–0 away win at Leeds United that mathematically secured Wolves' Championship status.

Millwall (loan)
On 31 January 2018, Marshall joined fellow Championship side Millwall on loan until the end of the 2017–18 season. He scored his first goal for Millwall in a 1–0 win at Burton Albion on 24 February 2018.

Norwich City
Marshall signed for Championship club Norwich City on 30 June 2018 on a four-year contract for an undisclosed fee.

Marshall left Norwich on 27 July 2019, after his contract was cancelled by mutual consent.

Stoneclough
In October 2019, Marshall signed for West Lancashire Division One side Stoneclough in a bid to help the 12th tier side push for promotion. Stoneclough had kept it under wraps until 19 January 2020 when they announced on Twitter he had signed for them. In the summer 2020, Marshall signed a new contract with the club for one further season.

International career
Marshall made his debut for the England U21s in a European U21 Championship qualifier against Azerbaijan at the Dalga Arena, coming on as a 61st-minute substitute for Wilfried Zaha. England went on to win the game 2–0.

Career statistics

Honours

Club
Carlisle United
Football League Trophy: 2010–11

—- Personal honours

Blackburn player of the season 2014-2015

References

External links

1991 births
Living people
Footballers from Salford
English footballers
England under-21 international footballers
Association football wingers
Manchester United F.C. players
Crewe Alexandra F.C. players
Stoke City F.C. players
Northampton Town F.C. players
Cheltenham Town F.C. players
Carlisle United F.C. players
Sheffield Wednesday F.C. players
Leicester City F.C. players
Blackburn Rovers F.C. players
Millwall F.C. players
Wolverhampton Wanderers F.C. players
Norwich City F.C. players
English Football League players